The Ambassador of Australia to Belgium is an officer of the Australian Department of Foreign Affairs and Trade and the head of the Embassy of the Commonwealth of Australia to the Kingdom of Belgium in Brussels. The position has the rank and status of an Ambassador Extraordinary and Plenipotentiary and holds non-resident accreditation for Luxembourg (since 1970). The Ambassador also acts as Australia's Ambassador to the European Union (EU), since 1962, and Ambassador to the North Atlantic Treaty Organization (NATO) since 2012. The current ambassador is Caroline Millar since November 2021.

Posting history
Belgium and Australia have enjoyed official diplomatic relations since 1 May 1959 when Australia appointed Edwin McCarthy, Ambassador to the Netherlands in The Hague, as the non-resident Ambassador to Belgium. McCarthy also served as Australia's first Ambassador to the European Communities, when he was appointed in March 1962, just before he left his post in the Netherlands and Belgium, until he retired in 1964. When McCarthy retired, Ralph Harry succeeded him as both ambassador to Belgium and the European Communities (became the EU in 1993).

On 18 September 1970, the governments of Australia and Luxembourg announced the establishment of diplomatic relations at ambassador level, with ambassador Owen Davis receiving dual accreditation while resident in Brussels.

Australia has been involved on an official level (as a 'global partner') with NATO since 2005 and the first Australian Ambassador to NATO was Brendan Nelson, appointed on 20 January 2012 following the signing of a memorandum of understanding between NATO and Australia.

List of ambassadors

Ambassador to the European Communities

Notes
 Served concurrently as the Australian Ambassador to the European Union, formerly the European Economic Community, 17 March 1964-present. 
 Served concurrently as the Australian Ambassador to the North Atlantic Treaty Organization, 20 January 2012-present.
 Served concurrently as the Australian Ambassador to the Grand Duchy of Luxembourg, ????-present.

See also
Australia–European Union relations
Foreign relations of Australia
Foreign relations of NATO#Australia

References

External links

Australian Embassy to Belgium and Luxembourg and Mission to the European Union and NATO

 
 
 
 
Belgium
Australia
European-Australian culture